Marian Savu (born 11 October 1972) is a retired Romanian football striker.

Career overview
Total matches played in Romanian First League: 223 matches – 77 goals.
European Cups: 12 matches – 1 goal.
Topscorer of the Romanian First League: 2000.

External links

1972 births
Living people
People from Teleorman County
Romanian footballers
Romanian expatriate footballers
CSM Flacăra Moreni players
FC Dinamo București players
FC Rapid București players
FC Brașov (1936) players
FC Shakhtar Donetsk players
FC Metalurh Donetsk players
FC Progresul București players
FC Sportul Studențesc București players
FC Petrolul Ploiești players
Fehérvár FC players
AEL Limassol players
Liga I players
Ukrainian Premier League players
Cypriot First Division players
Nemzeti Bajnokság I players
Expatriate footballers in Cyprus
Expatriate footballers in Hungary
Expatriate footballers in Ukraine
Romanian expatriate sportspeople in Ukraine
Romanian expatriate sportspeople in Cyprus
Association football forwards